The Spanish Fork High School Gymnasium at 320 South Main Street (SR-198) in Spanish Fork, Utah, United States is an Art Deco style building built in 1935 by the Public Works Administration.  It was listed on the National Register of Historic Places in 1985. It is not part of the current Spanish Fork High School campus, which is a number of blocks to the northwest of the original gymnasium. Instead it is used by the Nebo School District as part of its main offices.

See also

 National Register of Historic Places listings in Utah County, Utah

References

External links

Art Deco architecture in Utah
School buildings completed in 1935
Buildings and structures in Spanish Fork, Utah
Public Works Administration in Utah
School buildings on the National Register of Historic Places in Utah
National Register of Historic Places in Utah County, Utah
Event venues on the National Register of Historic Places in Utah
Sports venues on the National Register of Historic Places in Utah
1935 establishments in Utah
Sports venues completed in 1935